Colonel James Robert Powell (1814–1883) was a founder of the city of Birmingham, Alabama and the city's first elected mayor (1873–1875).  Before that, he held office in the Alabama State Senate (1853–1856) and the Alabama House of Representatives (1845–1846).  He also held the office of Sheriff of the County of Coosa, Alabama from 1842–1845.  He became well known as "The Duke of Birmingham" because of his "... remarkable activities as a pioneer in the early history of the city."

Early life
Powell was born on December 7, 1814 in Brunswick County of the Commonwealth of Virginia to Addison Powell (d. 1840) and Catherine R. Powell (d. 1858).  Being successful agriculturalists, his family was quite wealthy up until about 1830.  In 1833, he moved to Alabama where he worked as an academy teacher in Lowndes County.  Later, in partnership with his father, who had moved to Alabama at the urging of this particular son, he was a successful hotel keeper in the state's capitol city, Montgomery.  By 1836, he had moved to Wetumpka in Coosa County, where he became involved in a stage line, which he owned and managed himself and which had contracts for mail delivery in and around the entire state and as far north as Virginia.  While living in Wetumpka, he was elected as Sheriff of Coosa County in August 1842 and served until August 1845. After that, he was elected to represent the county of Coosa in the Alabama House of Representatives in 1845.  After serving one term in the House, he returned to Montgomery and in 1855 won election to the State Senate.  On December 14, 1858, after serving two terms in the Senate, he was married to Mary Jane Smythe (1825–1902) of Tennessee. February 19, 1860 saw the birth of their only child, daughter Mary Powell (1860-1930).

Military service
Little historical record is found concerning Powell's military service, but it is clear from the various references that he was addressed by many as "Colonel."  It is also clear that he did not serve in the U.S. Civil War, but remained in Coosa County with his mother and sisters during the war.  He did, however, have some involvement with the state militia in 1851 while living in Rockford, Alabama.  Reverend George E. Brewer gives the following account of a time in when a military drill of the 68th Regiment (3rd Brigade, 7th Division, Alabama Militia) was held on an empty field owned by Colonel Powell,

Elyton Land Company and the founding of Birmingham

On December 20, 1870, Powell and nine other men from in and around the Montgomery area, including a man named Josiah Morris organized a company called the Elyton Land Company for the purpose of "... buying lands and selling lots ... and affecting the building of a city, at or near the town of Elyton, in the County of Jefferson and State of Alabama."  The corporation was funded by the sale of 2,000 shares of capital stock valued at $200,000., distributed as follows.  These ten men were to be the founders of the new city to be established.

Josiah Morris worked for the South and North Alabama Railroad which was currently under construction between Decatur and Montgomery, and would have to cross the Alabama and Chattanooga Railroad which had already been completed from Chattanooga to about Tuskaloosa.  Knowing that the crossing would be in the Jones Valley near Elyton, he had previously agreed to purchase 4,150 acres of land east of Elyton from William Nabers and his wife Elizabeth for $25 per acre in cash and stock in the company to be formed.

On January 27, 1871, when the board of directors of the newly-formed corporation held its first meeting, Powell was unanimously named president of the company, and the shareholders in another meeting that same day declared in its bylaws that "The city to be built by the Elyton Land Company, near Elyton, in the County of Jefferson, State of Alabama shall be called 'Birmingham'."  Powell immediately relocated to the site of the new city and set up an office in a house owned by the Alabama and Chattanooga Railroad on the south side of the tracks adjacent to where the historic Union Passenger Depot was built and still stands.  As of October 2020, portions of South Powell Avenue still exist at this location and can be seen on area maps.

Upon arriving at the location, engineers began surveying the property and laying out the city streets under Powell's direction, and he negotiated with a supplier from Montgomery to make a large quantity of brick available for the building of houses and other uses.  He raised money for and arranged for the building of a hotel, a thirty-room frame structure on Nineteenth Street called the Relay House.  On September 25, 1872, the board of directors of the Elyton Land Company ordered Powell to build a water works for the new city, and eight months later the water supply to the town was turned on.

References

Mayors of Birmingham, Alabama
Alabama state senators
Alabama sheriffs
20th-century American politicians
American city founders
Members of the Alabama House of Representatives